Connery (anglicization of the Gaelic Ó Conaire) is a surname and may refer to:

 Edward Connery (born 1933), Canadian politician
 Gary Connery (born 1970), British skydiver and stuntman
 Jason Connery (born 1963), English actor, son of Sean Connery
 Lawrence J. Connery (1895–1941), American politician, brother of William P. Connery Jr.
 Neil Connery (1938–2021), Scottish actor, brother of Sean Connery
 Sean Connery (1930–2020), Scottish actor and producer; brother of Neil Connery and father of Jason Connery
 William P. Connery Jr. (1888–1937), American politician, brother of Lawrence J. Connery

Surnames of Irish origin